The 2017 wildfire season involved wildfires on multiple continents. On Greenland, which is mostly covered by ice and permafrost, multiple fires occurred in melted peat bogs, described as "unusual, and possibly unprecedented". Popular media asked whether the wildfires were related to global warming. Research published by NASA states "climate change has increased fire risk in many regions", but caused "greater severity in the colder latitudes" where boreal and temperate forests exist, and scholars have described "a warm weather fluctuation that has become more frequent in recent decades" related to wildfires, without naming any particular event as being directly caused by global warming.

List of wildfires
Events during the season include the following:

 Africa
 2017 Knysna fires

 Americas

2017 Arizona wildfires
Goodwin Fire, over 
2017 British Columbia wildfires
2017 California wildfires
2017 Chile wildfires
2017 Florida wildfires
Okefenokee National Wildlife Refuge, over 
2017 Idaho wildfires
Bearskin Fire
Highline Fire
2017 Montana wildfires
2017 Oregon wildfires
2017 Texas wildfires
 Utah's Tank Hollow Fire
2017 Washington wildfires
2017 was the most expensive firefighting year on record for the US Forest Service with over $2 billion spent. Record setting fires included the Lodgepole Complex Fire, the nation's largest that year; the La Tuna Fire, which was the largest in Los Angeles history; and the 2017 British Columbia wildfires, worst in the history of the province. The western U.S., as of October, witnessed about 50,000 wildfires, with more than 3.4 million hectares burned. In Canada, as of August, 7.4 million acres had burned, and British Columbia recorded its worst year for land burned since 1958. The 2017 California wildfires were the most destructive on record with over $9 billion in insurance claims from the October fires and expected over $20 billion more for December's fires.

 Europe

June 2017 Portugal wildfires
October 2017 Iberian wildfires
France's Mediterranean coast including Côte d'Azur, and Corsica
Depopulation of rural areas of Europe was also described as contributing to fires in Portugal and France.

The wildfires near the Calampiso seaside resort west of Palermo, forced the evacuation by boat of more than 700 tourists on July 12. More bushfires broke out across southern Italy and Sicily, as temperatures hit 40 °C in the week leading up to July 13. About 23 wildfires raged in southern Italy on Wednesday, including on the slopes of Mount Vesuvius near Naples. Two were north of Mount Etna, in the suburbs of Sicilian city of Catania on the 13th. Italy's environment minister said a man had been arrested on suspicion of arson and Gian Luca Galletti was quoted as saying in Italian media|: “If someone set fire to Vesuvius, I want to see them in jail for 15 years,” on July 13. 150 hectares of pine forest were destroyed in a blaze in Sicily a month earlier.

The June 2017 Portugal wildfires began in the Pedrógão Grande municipality on June 17–18, before spreading dramatically in the heat and thus causing a firestorm. It ended with 64-66 dead, over 250 injured and 40 evacuated villages.

Some 15 wildfires were reported in Albania on August 5 and others occurred elsewhere in the Balkans and a few other parts of Southern Europe.

Local and mainland firefighters (including a water bomber aircraft) arrived in Corsica to fires sweeping across the area of Palneca and it environs. Other smaller fires occurred in the rest of southern Europe amid the deadly heatwave on August 18.

 Oceania
2016–17 Australian bushfire season
2017 Port Hills fires in New Zealand

 Asia
A series of wildfires contributed to the Southeast Asian haze during the summer of 2017.

References

External links

Historical U.S. fire data for 2016

 
2017